The Kohlenberg is a hill in the county of Landkreis Waldeck-Frankenberg, Hesse, Germany.

Hills of Hesse
Mountains and hills of the Rhenish Massif